The Gar mosque and minaret are historical structures located in Gar village in the Isfahan province. The minaret dates back to Seljuq era, but the mosque belongs to the Ilkhanid age. The only remained part of the mosque is its mihrab, which has been decorated with stuccoes, but the minaret is relatively in a good condition and according to its inscription, it was built in 1121 by Abolghassem ebn-e Ahmad.

References

External links 

Mosques in Isfahan
Religious buildings and structures completed in 1121